Kalfou is a town and commune in Niger.

Communes of Niger